Nikolay Ivanovich Yefimov (9 December 1932 – 2 August 2022) was a Russian journalist and statesman.

Yefimov died in Moscow on 2 August 2022, at the age of 89.

References 

1932 births
2022 deaths
Moscow State University alumni
Journalists from Moscow
Politicians from Moscow
Soviet journalists
Russian newspaper editors
Soviet editors
20th-century Russian journalists
21st-century Russian journalists
Russian male journalists
Recipients of the Order of Lenin
Recipients of the Order of the Red Banner of Labour
Recipients of the Order of Friendship of Peoples
Central Committee of the Communist Party of the Soviet Union members